Necrotizing fasciitis (NF), also known as flesh-eating disease, is a bacterial infection that results in the death of parts of the body's soft tissue. It is a severe disease of sudden onset that spreads rapidly. Symptoms usually include red or purple skin in the affected area, severe pain, fever, and vomiting. The most commonly affected areas are the limbs and perineum.

Typically, the infection enters the body through a break in the skin such as a cut or burn. Risk factors include poor immune function such as from diabetes or cancer, obesity, alcoholism, intravenous drug use, and peripheral artery disease. It does not typically spread between people. The disease is classified into four types, depending on the infecting organism. Between 55 and 80% of cases involve more than one type of bacteria. Methicillin-resistant Staphylococcus aureus (MRSA) is involved in up to a third of cases. Medical imaging is often helpful to confirm the diagnosis.

Necrotizing fasciitis may be prevented with proper wound care and handwashing. It is usually treated with surgery to remove the infected tissue, and intravenous antibiotics. Often, a combination of antibiotics is used, such as penicillin G, clindamycin, IV vancomycin, and gentamicin. Delays in surgery are associated with a much higher risk of death. Despite high-quality treatment, the risk of death is between 25 and 35%.

Necrotizing fasciitis occurs in about 0.4 people per 100,000 per year in the U.S., and about 1 per 100,000 in Western Europe. Both sexes are affected equally. It becomes more common among older people and is rare in children. It has been described at least since the time of Hippocrates. The term "necrotizing fasciitis" first came into use in 1952.

Signs and symptoms
Symptoms may include fever, swelling, and complaints of excessive pain. The initial skin changes are similar to cellulitis or abscess, thus making the diagnosis at early stages difficult. Hardening of the skin and soft tissue and swelling beyond the area of skin changes are commonly present in those with early necrotizing changes. The redness and swelling usually blend into surrounding normal tissues. The overlying skin may appear shiny and tense. Other signs which are more suggestive of necrotizing changes (but present in later stages in 7 to 44% of the cases) are: formation of bullae, bleeding into the skin which is present before skin necrosis (skin turning from red to purple and black due to thrombosis of blood vessels), presence of gas in tissues, and reduced or absent sensation over the skin (due to the necrosis of the underlying nerves). Rapid progression to shock despite antibiotic therapy is another indication of necrotizing fasciitis. Necrotizing changes affecting the groin are known as Fournier gangrene.

However, those who are immunocompromised (have cancer, use corticosteroid, on radiotherapy, chemotherapy, HIV/AIDS, or prior organ or bone marrow transplantation) may not show typical symptoms. Immunocompromised persons also have twice the risk of death from necrotizing infections, so higher suspicion should be maintained in this group.

Cause

Risk factors
More than 70% of cases are recorded in people with at least one of these clinical situations: immunosuppression, diabetes, alcoholism/drug abuse/smoking, malignancies, and chronic systemic diseases. For reasons that are unclear, it occasionally occurs in people with an apparently normal general condition.

Necrotizing fasciitis can occur at any part of the body, but it is more commonly seen at the extremities, perineum, and genitals. Only a few of such cases arise from the chest and abdomen. Trauma is the usual cause of the infection, such as from intravenous drug injection, insulin injection, animal and insect bites, catheter insertion over the skin, or a fistula connecting skin to the internal body organs. Skin infections such as abscess and ulcers can also complicate necrotizing fasciitis. Spreading of infection through blood has been suggested for those with streptococcal pharyngitis. For infection of the perineum and genitals (Fournier gangrene), trauma, surgery, urinary tract infection, stones, and Bartholin gland abscess are the usual causes.

The risk of developing necrotizing fasciitis from a wound can be reduced by good wound care and handwashing.

Bacteria
Types of soft-tissue necrotizing infection can be divided into four classes according to the types of bacteria infecting the soft tissue. This classification system was first described by Giuliano and  his colleagues in 1977.

Type I infection: This is the most common type of infection, and accounts for 70 to 80% of cases. It is caused by a mixture of bacterial types, usually in abdominal or groin areas. This type of infection is usually caused by various species of Gram-positive cocci, (Staphylococcus aureus, Streptococcus pyogenes, and enterococci), Gram-negative rods,  (Escherichia coli, Pseudomonas aeruginosa), and anaerobes, (Bacteroides and Clostridium species). Populations of those affected are typically older with medical comorbidities such as diabetes mellitus, obesity, and immunodeficiency. Usually, trauma is not the cause of such infections. Previous history of abscess infection or gut perforation with bacterial translocation may be elicited. Clostridial infection accounts for 10% of type I infection.  Clostridium species involved are Clostridium perfringens, Clostridium septicum, and Clostridium sordellii, which typically cause gas gangrene (also known as myonecrosis). Clostridium perfringens produces two deadly toxins: alpha-toxin and theta-toxin. Alpha-toxin causes excessive platelet aggregation which blocks blood vessels and deprives the vital organs of oxygen supply. This creates an acidic, oxygen-deficient environment for the proliferation of bacteria. When alpha-toxin is absorbed by soft tissues, it can inhibit the migration of white blood cells from blood vessels into the soft tissue, thus impairing phagocyte function. The two toxins together can cause destruction of red blood cells in blood vessels, damage to the integrity of the blood vessels, and suppression of heart function.

Clostridium sordellii can also produce two major toxins: all known virulent strains produce the essential virulence factor lethal toxin (TcsL), and a number also produce haemorrhagic toxin (TcsH). TcsL and TcsH are both members of the large clostridial cytotoxin (LCC) family. The key Clostridium septicum virulence factor is a pore-forming toxin called alpha-toxin, though it is unrelated to the Clostridium perfringens alpha-toxin. Myonecrotic infections caused by these clostridial species commonly occur in injecting heroin users. Those with clostridial infections typically have severe pain at the wound site, where the wound typically drains foul-smelling blood mixed with serum (serosanguinous discharge). Shock can progress rapidly after initial injury or infection, and once the state of shock is established, the chance of dying exceeds 50%. Another bacterium associated with similar rapid disease progression is group A streptococcal infection (mostly Streptococcus pyogenes). Meanwhile, other bacterial infections require two or more days to become symptomatic.

Type II infection: This infection accounts for 20 to 30% of cases, mainly involving the extremities. This mainly involves  Streptococcus pyogenes bacteria, alone or in combination with staphylococcal infections. Both types of bacteria can progress rapidly and manifest as toxic shock syndrome. Streptococcus species produce M protein, which acts as a superantigen, stimulating a massive systemic immune response which is not effective against the bacterial antigen, precipitating shock. Type II infection more commonly affects young, healthy adults with a history of injury.

Type III infection: Vibrio vulnificus, a bacterium found in saltwater, is a rare cause of this infection, which occurs through a break in the skin.  Disease progression is similar to type II but sometimes with little visible skin changes.

Type IV infection: Some authors have described the type IV infection as fungal in nature.

Diagnosis

Early diagnosis is difficult, as the disease often looks early on like a simple superficial skin infection. While a number of laboratory and imaging modalities can raise the suspicion for necrotizing fasciitis, none can rule it out. The gold standard for diagnosis is a surgical exploration in a setting of high suspicion. When in doubt, a small incision can be made into the affected tissue, and if a finger easily separates the tissue along the fascial plane, the diagnosis is confirmed and an extensive debridement should be performed.

Medical imaging

Imaging has a limited role in the diagnosis of necrotizing fasciitis. The time delay in performing imaging is a major concern. Plain radiography may show subcutaneous emphysema (gas in the subcutaneous tissue), which is strongly suggestive of necrotizing changes, but it is not sensitive enough to detect all the cases, because necrotizing skin infections caused by bacteria other than clostridial infections usually do not show subcutaneous emphysema. If the diagnosis is still in doubt, computed tomography (CT) scans and magnetic resonance imaging (MRI) are more sensitive modalities than plain radiography. However, both the CT scan and MRI are not sensitive enough to rule out necrotizing changes completely. CT scan may show fascial thickening, edema, subcutaneous gas, and abscess formation. In MRI, when fluid collection with deep fascia involvement occurs, thickening or enhancement with contrast injection, necrotizing fasciitis should be strongly suspected. Meanwhile, ultrasonography can show superficial abscess formation, but is not sensitive enough to diagnose necrotizing fasciitis. CT scan is able to detect about 80% of cases, while MRI may pick up slightly more.

Scoring system
A white blood cell count greater than 15,000 cells/mm3 and serum sodium level less than 135 mmol/L have a sensitivity of 90% in detecting the necrotizing soft tissue infection. It also has a 99% chance of ruling out necrotizing changes if the values have shown otherwise. Various scoring systems are being developed to determine the likelihood of getting necrotizing fasciitis, but a scoring system developed by Wong and colleagues in 2004 is the most commonly used. It is the laboratory risk indicator for necrotizing fasciitis (LRINEC) score, which can be used to stratify by risk those people having signs of severe cellulitis or abscess to determine the likelihood of necrotizing fasciitis being present. It uses six laboratory values: C-reactive protein, total white blood cell count, hemoglobin, sodium, creatinine, and blood glucose. A score of 6 or more indicates that necrotizing fasciitis should be seriously considered. The scoring criteria are:
 CRP (mg/L) ≥150: 4 points
 WBC count (×103/mm3)
 <15: 0 points
 15–25: 1 point
 >25: 2 points
 Hemoglobin (g/dL)
 >13.5: 0 points
 11–13.5: 1 point
 <11: 2 points
 Sodium (mmol/L) <135: 2 points
 Creatinine (umol/L) >141: 2 points
 Glucose (mmol/L) >10: 1 point

However, the scoring system has not been validated. The values would be falsely positive if any other inflammatory conditions are present. Therefore, the values derived from this scoring system should be interpreted with caution. About 10% of patients with necrotizing fasciitis in the original study still had a LRINEC score <6. A validation study showed that patients with a LRINEC score ≥6 have a higher rate of both death and amputation.

Prevention
Necrotizing fasciitis can be partly prevented by good wound care and handwashing.

Treatment
Surgical debridement (cutting away affected tissue) is the mainstay of treatment for necrotizing fasciitis. Early medical treatment is often presumptive; thus, antibiotics should be started as soon as this condition is suspected. Tissue cultures (rather than wound swabs) are taken to determine appropriate antibiotic coverage, and antibiotics may be changed in light of results. Besides blood pressure control and hydration, support should be initiated for those with unstable vital signs and low urine output.

Surgery
Aggressive wound debridement should be performed early, usually as soon as the diagnosis of necrotizing soft tissue infection (NSTI) is made. Surgical incisions often extend beyond the areas of induration (the hardened tissue) to remove the damaged blood vessels that are responsible for the induration. However, cellulitic soft tissues are sometimes spared from debridement for later skin coverage of the wound. More than one operation may be used to remove additional necrotic tissue. In some cases when an extremity is affected by a NSTI, amputation may be the surgical treatment of choice. After the wound debridement, adequate dressings should be applied to prevent exposure of bones, tendons, and cartilage so that such structures do not dry out and to promote wound healing.

For necrotizing infection of the perineal area (Fournier's gangrene), wound debridement and wound care in this area can be difficult because of the excretory products that often render this area dirty and affect the wound-healing process. Therefore, regular dressing changes with a fecal management system can help to keep the wound at the perineal area clean. Sometimes, colostomy may be necessary to divert the excretory products to keep the wound at the perineal area clean.

Antibiotics
Empiric antibiotics are usually initiated as soon as the diagnosis of NSTI has been made, and then later changed to culture-guided antibiotic therapy. In the case of NSTIs, empiric antibiotics are broad-spectrum, covering gram-positive (including MRSA), gram-negative, and anaerobic bacteria.

While studies have compared moxifloxacin (a fluoroquinolone) and amoxicillin-clavulanate (a penicillin) and evaluated appropriate duration of treatment (varying from 7 to 21 days), no definitive conclusions on the efficacy of treatment, ideal duration of treatment, or the adverse effects could be made due to poor-quality evidence.

Add-on therapy
 Hyperbaric oxygen: While human and animal studies have shown that high oxygen tension in tissues helps to reduce edema, stimulate fibroblast growth, increase the killing ability of white blood cells, inhibit bacterial toxin release, and increase antibiotic efficacy, no high-quality trials have been shown to support or refute the use of hyperbaric oxygen therapy in patients with NSTIs.
 Intravenous immunoglobulin (IVIG): No clear difference between using IVIG and placebo has been shown in the treatment of NSTIs, and one study showed serious adverse effects with IVIG use, including acute kidney injury, allergic reactions, aseptic meningitis syndrome, haemolytic anaemia, thrombi, and transmissible agents.
 AB103: One study assessed the efficacy of a new type of treatment that affects the immune response, called AB103. The study showed no difference in mortality with use of this therapy, but it is difficult to draw definitive conclusions due to low-quality evidence.
 Supportive therapy: Supportive therapy, often including intravenous hydration, wound care, anticoagulants to prevent thromboembolic events, pain control, etc. should always be provided to patients when appropriate.

Epidemiology
Necrotizing fasciitis affects about 0.4 in every 100,000 people per year in the United States. About 1,000 cases of necrotizing fasciitis occur per year in the United States, but the rates have been increasing. This could be due to increasing awareness of this condition, leading to increased reporting, or  bacterial virulence or increasing bacterial resistance against antibiotics. In some areas of the world, it is as common as one in every 100,000 people.

Higher rates of necrotizing fasciitis are seen in those with obesity or diabetes, and those who are immunocompromised or alcoholic, or have peripheral artery disease. However, the disease may also occur in young, healthy adults with no underlying illnesses. NSAIDs may increase the rates of necrotizing infections due to the modification of immune response in the body, because NSAIDs inhibit the cycloxygenase-1 and cycloxygenase-2 enzymes which are important in producing thromboxane and prostaglandin E2. Prostaglandin has been responsible for fever, inflammation, and pain. The inhibition of prostaglandin E2 production reduces inflammatory response and leukocyte adhesion, and thus reduces immune response against bacterial invasion, giving rise to soft-tissue infection.

History
In the fifth century BCE, Hippocrates described necrotizing soft tissue infection as a disease where those affected would have "erysipelas all over the body while the cause was only a trivial accident. Bones, flesh, and sinew (cord, tendon, or nerve) would fall off from the body and there were many deaths". The first English description for necrotizing soft-tissue infection was by British surgeon Leonard Gillespie and British physicians Gilbert Blaine and Thomas Trotter in the 18th century. At that time, necrotizing soft-tissue infections were known variously as "phagedaenic ulcer" (ulceration that spreads and destroys surrounding tissue), "gangrenous phagedena", "gangrenous ulcer", "malignant ulcer", "putrid ulcer", "fulminating gangrene", "necrotizing erysipelas", "gangrenous erysipelas", "crepitant cellulitis", "gangrenous cellulitis", "Meleney cellulitis", "necrotizing synergistic cellulitis", "hemolytic streptococcal gangrene", "progressive bacterial synergistic gangrene", or "necrotizing abscess". Later, "hospital gangrene" became more commonly used. In 1871 Confederate States Army surgeon Joseph Jones reported 2,642 cases of hospital gangrene with a mortality rate of 46%. In 1883, Dr Jean-Alfred Fournier described the necrotizing infection of the perineum and scrotum, now called Fournier gangrene. The term "necrotizing fasciitis" was first coined by Wilson in 1952. Its definition has become broader, to include not only infection of fascia, but also other soft-tissue infection. Despite being disfavored by the medical community, the term "galloping gangrene" is frequently used in sensationalistic news media to refer to outbreaks of necrotizing fasciitis.

Society and culture

Notable cases 
 1994: Lucien Bouchard, former premier of Québec, Canada, who was infected while leader of the federal official opposition Bloc Québécois party, lost a leg to the illness.
 1994: A cluster of cases occurred in Gloucestershire, in the west of England. Of five confirmed and one probable infection, two died. The cases were believed to be connected. The first two had acquired the Streptococcus pyogenes bacteria during surgery; the remaining four were community-acquired. The cases generated much newspaper coverage, with lurid headlines such as "Flesh Eating Bug Ate My Face".
 1997: Ken Kendrick, former agent and partial owner of the San Diego Padres and Arizona Diamondbacks, contracted the disease. He had seven surgeries in a little more than a week and later fully recovered.
 2004: Don Rickles, American stand-up comedian, actor, and author, known especially for his insult comedy, contracted the disease in his left leg. He had six operations and later recovered. The condition confined him in his later years to performing comedy from a chair.
 2004: Eric Allin Cornell, winner of the 2001 Nobel Prize in Physics, lost his left arm and shoulder to the disease.
 2005: Alexandru Marin, an experimental particle physicist, professor at MIT, Boston University, and Harvard University, and researcher at CERN and JINR, died from the disease.
 2006 Alan Coren, British writer and satirist, announced in his Christmas column for The Times that his long absence as a columnist had been caused by his contracting the disease while on holiday in France.
 2009: R. W. Johnson, British journalist and historian, contracted the disease in March after injuring his foot while swimming. His leg was amputated above the knee.
 2011: Jeff Hanneman, guitarist for the thrash metal band Slayer, contracted the disease. He died of liver failure two years later, on May 2, 2013, and it was speculated that his infection was the cause of death. However, on May 9, 2013, the official cause of death was announced as alcohol-related cirrhosis. Hanneman and his family had apparently been unaware of the extent of the condition until shortly before his death.
 2011: Peter Watts, Canadian science fiction author, contracted the disease. On his blog, Watts reported, "I'm told I was a few hours away from being dead ... If there was ever a disease fit for a science-fiction writer, flesh-eating disease has got to be it. This ... spread across my leg as fast as a Star Trek space disease in time-lapse."
 2014: Daniel Gildenlöw, Swedish singer and songwriter for the band Pain of Salvation, spent several months in a hospital after being diagnosed with necrotizing fasciitis on his back in early 2014. After recovering, he wrote the album In the Passing Light of Day, a concept album about his experience during the hospitalization.
 2014: Ricky Bartlett, CBS Radio Morning Host, had his left leg amputated. He got the disease during a trip to Wyoming & South Dakota, USA. He lost his right leg to bone disease (associated with the flesh eating disease he contacted) in 2022.
 2015: Edgar Savisaar, Estonian politician, had his right leg amputated. He got the disease during a trip to Thailand.
 2018: Alex Smith, an American football quarterback for the Washington Football Team of the National Football League (NFL), contracted the disease after being injured during a game. He suffered an open compound fracture in his lower leg, which became infected. Smith narrowly avoided amputation, and eventually returned to playing professional football in October 2020. Smith's injury and recovery is the subject of the ESPN documentary "E60 Presents: Project 11".

See also
 Capnocytophaga canimorsus
 Gangrene
 Mucormycosis, a rare fungal infection that can resemble necrotizing fasciitis (See type IV NF listing above)
 Noma (disease)
 Toxic shock syndrome
 Vibrio vulnificus

References

External links 

 
 LRINEC Score Online

Gangrene
Bacterial diseases
Disorders of fascia
Fasciitis, necrotizing
Bacterium-related cutaneous conditions
Necrosis
Rare diseases
Wikipedia medicine articles ready to translate
Wikipedia emergency medicine articles ready to translate